was a town located in Sashima District, Ibaraki Prefecture, Japan.

As of 2003, the town had an estimated population of 39,220 and a density of 787.87 persons per km2. The total area was 49.78 km2.

On September 12, 2005, Sanwa, along with the town of Sōwa (also from Sashima District), was merged into the expanded city of Koga.

External links
 Koga official website 

Dissolved municipalities of Ibaraki Prefecture